Hollins is the surname of:

People:
 Alexander Hollins (born 1996), American football player
 Alfred Hollins (1865–1942), British composer and organist
 Andre Hollins (born 1992), American basketball player
 Arthur Hollins (footballer), English footballer
 Arthur Hollins (politician) (1876–1962), English Member of Parliament
Austin Hollins (born 1991), American basketball player for Maccabi Tel Aviv of the Israeli Basketball Premier League 
 Chris Hollins (born 1971), BBC sports presenter
 Damon Hollins (born 1974), American former Major League Baseball player
 Dave Hollins (born 1966), American former Major League Baseball player
 Dave Hollins (footballer) (born 1938), Welsh former football goalkeeper
 David Hollins (born 1951), former Australian rules footballer
 Ellis Hollins (born 1999), English child actor
 Frank Hollins (1877–1963), English cricketer
 Harry Hollins (1932–1989), American politician
 H. B. Hollins (1854–1938), American financier, banker and railroad magnate
 Hue Hollins (1940–2013), former National Basketball Association referee
 Jessie Hollins (1970–2009), American baseball player
 John Hollins (born 1946), English retired football player and coach
 John Hollins (artist) (1798–1855), English portrait painter
 John Hollins (cricketer) (1890–1938), English cricketer
 Justin Hollins (born 1996), American football player
 Laura Hollins (born 1983), birth name of Agyness Deyn, English fashion model, actress and singer
 Leslie Hollins (1897–1984), Australian politician
 Lionel Hollins (born 1953), American National Basketball Association former player and head coach
 Mack Hollins (born 1993), American football player
 Marion Hollins (1892–1944), American amateur golfer and golf course developer, daughter of H. B. Hollins
 Peter Hollins (1800–1886), English sculptor
 Ralph Hollins (born 1931), American naturalist
 Ryan Hollins (born 1984), American basketball player
 Sandra Hollins, American politician elected to the Utah State House of Representatives in 2014
 Sheila Hollins, Baroness Hollins (born 1946), British professor of psychiatry
 Tony Hollins (1909–1957), American blues musician
 Tyree Hollins (born 1990), American football player

Fictional characters:
 Dave Hollins: Space Cadet, from the BBC Radio 4 series Son of Cliché
 Imogen Hollins, from the BBC soap opera Doctors
 Jack Hollins, from the BBC soap opera Doctors
 Karen Hollins, from the BBC soap opera Doctors
 Rob Hollins, from the BBC soap opera Doctors